Alice Shrestha is a Nepalese swimmer, who specialised in breaststroke events. Shrestha qualified for the men's 100 m breaststroke at the 2004 Summer Olympics in Athens, by receiving a Universality place from FINA in an entry time of 1:15.49. He participated in heat one against three other swimmers Eric Williams of Nigeria, Chisela Kanchela of Zambia, and Amar Shah of Kenya. He rounded out a small field of four with a time of 1:12.25, setting a new national record.

References

External links
 

1985 births
Living people
Nepalese male swimmers
Olympic swimmers of Nepal
Swimmers at the 2004 Summer Olympics
Swimmers at the 2002 Asian Games
Male breaststroke swimmers
Asian Games competitors for Nepal
21st-century Nepalese people